The state of North Carolina has 42 official state emblems, as well as other designated places and events.  The majority are determined by acts of the North Carolina General Assembly and record in Chapters 144, 145, and 149 of the North Carolina General Statutes.  The state's nicknames – "The Old North State" and "The Tar Heel State" – are both traditional, but have never been passed into law by the General Assembly.

The first symbol was the Seal of North Carolina, which was made official in 1871. The original seal also contained the future state motto. It served as the state's only emblem for 14 years until the adoption of the state flag in 1885. Enacted by law in 2013, the newest symbols of North Carolina are the state art medium, clay; the state fossil, the megalodon teeth; the state frog, the Pine Barrens tree frog; the state marsupial, the Virginia opossum; and the state salamander, the marbled salamander.

Insignia

Flora

Fauna

Geology

Culture

See also
List of North Carolina-related topics
Lists of United States state insignia
State of North Carolina

References
General

Specific

State symbols
North Carolina